U.S. Coast Guard Station may refer to:

U.S. Coast Guard Station (Brigantine City, New Jersey), formerly listed on the National Register of Historic Places in Atlantic County, New Jersey
U.S. Coast Guard Station (Virginia Beach, Virginia), listed on the National Register of Historic Places in Virginia Beach, Virginia